Gilkerson may refer to:

Gilkerson, West Virginia, an unincorporated community in Wayne County
John Gilkerson, an American soccer player

See also
Gilkeson, a surname
Gilkerson's Union Giants, an independent Negro semi-pro baseball team